Freetime Machos is a Finnish documentary film about the bromance of two players in world's most northerly rugby club called OYUS Rugby based in Oulu, Finland. The film is directed by Mika Ronkainen and it had its world premiere at the Joris Ivens Competition of IDFA in November 2009. The film got its North American premiere at Tribeca Film Festival in April 2010. It was also part of the Edinburgh International Film Festival in June 2010.

Reviews

External links 
 

2009 films
German documentary films
2000s Finnish-language films
2009 comedy films
Documentary films about sports
Finnish documentary films
2009 documentary films
2000s German films